Marwan Lahoud (Arab: مروان لحود), born March 6, 1966, in Lebanon, is a naturalized French-Lebanese weapons engineer, living in France. He was deputy chief executive officer for strategy and marketing for the Airbus group until February 2017.
In May 2017, he was appointed chairman of the supervisory board of OT-Morpho, a position he only held for a short time, even if he remained director for two years of different entities of this group, renamed from IDEMIA.

Biography

Youth, studies 
Marwan Lahoud was born into a family of Lebanese Maronite Christians. He is the son of Victor Lahoud, a former Lebanese state intelligence officer.

After two years of preparatory classes at the Sainte-Geneviève Jesuit private high school in Versailles, he joined the École Polytechnique in 1984. Obtaining French nationality enabled him to join the armaments corps upon leaving the École Polytechnique in 1986: in this context, he chose the National School of Aeronautics and Space for his training as an armaments engineer.

Civil servant 
Marwan Lahoud began his career at the General Delegation for Armaments, in 1989. In 1994, he became project manager in the technical service of tactical missile systems (STSMT) then he was appointed shortly after assistant to the director of missiles and space of the DGA, Jean-Pierre Rabault.

At the end of 1995, he was an advisor for industrial affairs, research and armaments in the cabinet of Charles Millon, Minister of Defense. He participated in the restructuring of industries in the sector, notably with the ousting of Alain Gomez from Thomson-CSF. He also prepared the merger between Aerospace and Dassault Aviation but the process fails shortly before its end, because of the dissolution of National Assembly in 1997.

Career in the aviation industry 
Marwan Lahoud was recruited in 1998 by Aerospatiale and became vice president for development. In 2000, he negotiated the merger with Matra, the first step in the creation of EADS. In June 1999, Marwan Lahoud was appointed deputy director to the deputy director in charge of strategic coordination for Aérospatiale-Matra and to the deputy director for military affairs.

When EADS was created in July 2000, he was appointed senior vice-president of mergers and acquisitions, and as such was responsible for EADS mergers and acquisitions operations, such as the creation of Airbus, MBDA, from Astrium. On January 1, 2003, at the age of 36, he became President and CEO of MBDA. He introduces his brother Imad to Jean-Louis Gergorin; the latter then became the protagonists of the Clearstream 2 affair.

In June 2007, he was appointed chief strategy and marketing officer of the EADS group. He replaces Jean-Paul Gut in this key position. In these functions, he negotiates the merger with BAE Systems which will not be completed. In 2012, he was appointed Managing Director of EADS France, while retaining his position as Strategic Director.

His name was mentioned for the management of Areva in 2012, then that of Thales and Safran in 2014.

As deputy managing director of Airbus in charge of strategy, he leaves the European aeronautics and defense group, Airbus announced in a press release, confirming the information revealed by the La Tribune website on February 7, 2017. His departure is effective at the end of February 2017.

Airbus controversy 
His unexpected February 2017 departure from AIRBUS seems linked to the corruption scandal in which AIRBUS was involved from 2012. "Airbus ran 'massive' bribery scheme to win orders" (title of the article in the Financial Times of January 31, 2020 in which he is mentioned).

Lahoud is mentioned by numerous newspapers articles and publications as central to a system of illegal commissions.

In France, an investigation by Médiapart published on July 28, 2017, mentioned that the National Financial Prosecutor's Office and its British counterpart, the Serious Fraud Office had reported the illegal payments made by the SMO department of Airbus while led by Lahoud.

Then, in 2014, it was the Kazakhgate affair. "During a search at Airbus Helicopters, French justice discovers emails attesting that the group has given its agreement in principle to pay 12 million euros in bribes to the Prime Minister of Kazakhstan to facilitate a sale of helicopters ”, reveals Mediapart. In this case, police from the Central Anti-Corruption Office (OCLCIFF) then searched the home of former Airbus Group number 2 Marwan Lahoud on the morning of February 8, 2016.

According to Mediapart, a leaflet written by Marwan Lahoud, n° 2 of Airbus Group, predicted that the commissions could reach 250 million dollars, according to the two Turkish agents. According to documents cited by Mediapart, the SMO's trick to conceal these commissions were false invoices issued for a fictitious pipeline project in the Caspian Sea.

Mediapart reports in 2017 about another Kazakh corruption case. And again in 2019 about a corruption case for the sale of aircraft in Egypt.

In Great Britain, the Financial Times published on January 31, 2020, in an article entitled "Airbus ran 'massive' bribery 'schemes to win orders", a photo of him with this title: "Marwan Lahoud, who led the strategy organization and marketing of Airbus, SMO, a division dedicated to securing sales in emerging markets and at the heart of a catalog of offenses.

In Germany, the Handelsblatt wrote a long article on September 10, 2017 on these corruption cases, and in particular: "Although Kazakhstan's case is serious enough, there could be worse things to come as investigators look to civil aviation contracts with China and Turkey. In the latter case, Lahoud is said to have signed 250 million dollars in bribes. Airbus denies the allegations, but some say that Mr. Lahoud's sudden departure from the firm last February now appears in a new light." (See English version of the article of the website of Handelsblatt.)

Marwan Lahoud was taken into custody in September 2019 for commissions paid to Alexandre Djouhri, cited in this by an article in Médiapart of September 4, 2019, relayed on the Facebook page of this newspaper:

"Former Airbus executives Marwan Lahoud and Jean-Paul Gut were taken into police custody and confronted last June in the Libyan affair. In 2009, Claude Guéant had put pressure on Airbus (ex-EADS ) pays a commission for the benefit of Alexandre Djouhri on the sale of planes to Libya, and the judges discovered that a sum of 4 million euros had been directed in early 2010 to a mysterious Lebanese company."

In January 2020, the French press announced that the French, British and American courts had validated the agreements made earlier this week by Airbus and the French National Financial Prosecutor's Office (PNF), the British Serious Fraud Office (SFO) and the Department of Justice ( DOJ) in the United States under which the European group AIRBUS undertakes to pay fines totaling 3.6 billion euros: 2.08 billion in France as part of a public interest legal agreement (CJIP ), 984 million in the United Kingdom and 526 million in the United States.

Today dissolved, the group's unit called Strategy and Marketing Organization (SMO), led by Marwan Lahoud, was at the heart of the matter.

Almost all the articles published on these agreements underline that the ex-leaders may be worried within the framework of a preliminary investigation still in progress.

Legion of Honor 
Marwan Lahoud was knighted on April 9, 2004, then promoted to officer on July 12, 2013.

References 

Officiers of the Légion d'honneur
Lebanese businesspeople
École Polytechnique alumni
Young Leaders of the French-American Foundation
Supaéro alumni
French aerospace engineers
Year of birth missing (living people)
Living people
Lahoud family